Gordon Douglas Roberts (born October 2, 1957) is an American former professional ice hockey defenseman who played 1,097 NHL regular season games from 1979 to 1994. He was a two-time Stanley Cup winner with the Pittsburgh Penguins. He is an honoured member of the United States Hockey Hall of Fame. 

His brother Doug Roberts is also a former NHL player.

Amateur career
Roberts was named after Detroit Red Wings star Gordie Howe, who was eventually Roberts' teammate in Hartford, and grew up playing junior hockey in the Southern Ontario Junior Hockey League for the Detroit Jr. Red Wings.

Professional career
Roberts was drafted in the third round, 54th overall by the Montreal Canadiens in the 1977 NHL amateur draft. His professional career started in 1975 when he was signed as a 17-year-old underage junior by the WHA New England Whalers. He represented the Whalers in the 1977 and 1978 WHA All-Star Game and was still with New England when the NHL and WHA merged in 1979.

In 1980, the Whalers traded Roberts to the Minnesota North Stars for Mike Fidler. He remained a North Star for eight seasons before moving to the Philadelphia Flyers in 1988, who promptly traded him to the St. Louis Blues after only 11 games. During this time, Roberts also played for Team USA in the 1984 Canada Cup as well as the 1982 and 1987 Ice Hockey World Championship tournaments.

Roberts won two Stanley Cups with the Pittsburgh Penguins in 1991 and 1992 and became the first American player to appear in 1,000 NHL games, in 1992. He played for the Boston Bruins during his final two years in the NHL, then played two more seasons in the International Hockey League before finally retiring at age 39 in 1996 -- the last of Gordie Howe's old teammates still on the ice. (Incredibly, Howe himself still wasn't done as a player, making a cameo appearance with the IHL's Detroit Vipers in 1997, at the age of 69.)

Post Playing Career
Roberts served as the player/coach of the 1994–95 International Hockey League Chicago Wolves as well as the assistant coach of the Phoenix Coyotes for the 1998 and 1999 seasons.  In recent years, he has worked as a pro scout for the Montreal Canadiens, specializing in Western Canada and the Western U.S. In 2012, Roberts became the head coach for the Elk River High School boys hockey team in Elk River, Minnesota.  For the 2017-2018 season, he was an assistant coach for the Maple Grove Senior High School Crimson boys hockey team.

Awards and achievements
Inducted into the United States Hockey Hall of Fame in 1999.
Played in 1977 and 1978 WHA All-Star Game
2- Time Stanley Cup champion (1991, 1992)

Career statistics

Regular season and playoffs

International

See also
List of NHL players with 1000 games played

External links
 
HockeyDraftCentral profile

1957 births
Living people
American men's ice hockey defensemen
Arizona Coyotes coaches
Arizona Coyotes executives
Boston Bruins players
Chicago Wolves (IHL) players
Hartford Whalers players
Ice hockey people from Detroit
Minnesota Moose players
Minnesota North Stars players
Montreal Canadiens draft picks
Montreal Canadiens scouts
New England Whalers players
Peoria Rivermen (IHL) players
Philadelphia Flyers players
Pittsburgh Penguins players
St. Louis Blues players
Sportspeople from Detroit
Stanley Cup champions
United States Hockey Hall of Fame inductees
Victoria Cougars (WHL) players
Ice hockey coaches from Michigan
Ice hockey people from Michigan